The 1967 American Football League season was the eighth regular season of the AFL.

The season ended when the Oakland Raiders (13–1) hosted the Houston Oilers (9–4–1) in the AFL championship game on December 31. The Raiders won 40–7 and then met the NFL's Green Bay Packers in Super Bowl II two weeks later, won by Green Bay, 33–14.

This was the final season that all AFL on-field officials wore vertically striped red and white uniforms. The next year all officials would wear uniforms mirroring those of their NFL counterparts.

Division races
The AFL's nine teams, grouped into two divisions (5 teams in the Eastern Division), faced each other at least once, and each team would play six others twice.  Though the New York Jets and the Houston Oilers were both in the Eastern Division, they met only once that season, on October 15.  The best team in the Eastern Division would play against the best in the Western Division in a championship game.  If there was a tie in the standings at the top of either division, a one-game playoff would be held to determine the division winner.

Regular season

Results

(*) Played at San Diego Stadium due to the Fenway Park, Patriots' home field, being used by stadium's owner, Boston Red Sox, for the 1967 World Series.

Standings

Playoffs

AFL Championship Game
Oakland Raiders 40, Houston Oilers 7, on December 31, 1967, at Oakland–Alameda County Coliseum in Oakland, California
Super Bowl II 
Green Bay (NFL) 33, Oakland (AFL) 14, on January 14, 1968, at Orange Bowl in Miami

Stadium changes
 The San Diego Chargers moved from Balboa Stadium to San Diego Stadium

Coaching changes
Denver Broncos: Lou Saban became the team's new head coach. Mac Speedie resigned after starting the 1966 season 0–2, and then line coach Ray Malavasi served as interim for the remaining 12 games.

External links
Football Database

 
American Football League seasons